Liyuan may refer to:


Places in China

Inhabited places
 Liyuan, Beijing (梨园地区), an area of Tongzhou District, Beijing
 Liyuan, Sangzhi, a town in Zhangjiajie, Hunan
 Liyuan, Qinyuan County (李元镇), a town in Qinyuan County, Shanxi
 Liyuan, Wenxi County (礼元镇), a town in Wenxi County, Shanxi
 Liyuan Town (栗园镇), a town in Kaiping District, Tangshan, Hebei

Other places
 Liyuan Dam, on the Jinsha River in Yunnan
 Liyuan (garden), in Wuxi, China

Other uses
 Liyuan opera (梨园戏), form of opera originating in Fujian, China
 6741 Liyuan, a main-belt asteroid
 Pear Garden (梨园, or Liyuan Garden), first known royal acting and musical academy in China

See also
 Liyuan station (disambiguation)
 Li Yuan (disambiguation)